Paolo Jacobini (born 26 September 1919 in Rome – 2003) was an Italian professional football player.

He played for 6 seasons (97 games, 1 goal) in the Serie A for A.S. Roma.

Honours
 Serie A champion: 1941/42.

References

1919 births
2003 deaths
Italian footballers
Serie A players
A.S. Roma players
S.S.C. Napoli players
Association football midfielders